A cadet is a trainee, typically to become a military officer.

Cadet may also refer to:
Cadet (dinghy), a junior trainer sailing dinghy 
Cadets (film), a 1939 German war film
Cadets (1988 TV pilot), an American sitcom summer special
Cadet (genealogy), a younger son
Cadet (Paris Métro)
Cadet (rapper) (1990–2019), English rap musician
Cadet Records, a music record label
Éliphène Cadet (born 1980), Haitian footballer
Jean Lud Cadet, Haitian-American psychiatrist
Eliezer Cadet (born 1897), Haitian Vodou priest
Aircore Cadet, an ultralight aircraft
Baker-McMillan Cadet, a glider
Traffic cadet, someone who regulates traffic
International Cadet Australian Championship, a youth sailing competition
Cadet branch or cadet line, the male-line descendants of a monarch or patriarch's younger sons
IBM 1620 or CADET, a 1959 inexpensive scientific computer
Cadet, a rank in the Australian Defence Force Cadets
Cadet, a member of the historical Russian Constitutional Democratic Party
Cadet, a member of The Cadets Drum and Bugle Corps
 Cadet (band), a Christian alternative rock band from Eugene, Oregon, formed in 2000 and disbanded in 2004
 Cadet (album), a 2001 studio album by the band, Cadet
The Cadet (newspaper), the weekly student newspaper of the Virginia Military Institute
Cadet (shipwreck), Lake George near Bolton in Warren County, New York
 Cadet, Missouri, an unincorporated community in Union Township, Washington County, Missouri, United States
Nord Aviation N 500 Cadet, single-seat VTOL research aircraft built by Nord Aviation in 1967

See also
Cadette (disambiguation)
Kadet (disambiguation)
Kadets (disambiguation)
The Cadets (disambiguation)